A maritime mobile service (also MMS or maritime mobile radiocommunication service) is a mobile service between coast stations and ship stations, or between ship stations, or between associated on-board communication stations. The service may also be used by survival craft stations and emergency position-indicating radiobeacon stations.

Classification
This radiocommunication service is classified in accordance with ITU Radio Regulations (article 1) as follows: 
Maritime mobile service
Maritime mobile-satellite service (article 1.29)
Port operations service (article 1.30)
Ship movement service (article 1.31)

Frequency allocation
The allocation of radio frequencies is provided according to Article 5 of the ITU Radio Regulations (edition 2012).

In order to improve harmonisation in spectrum utilisation, the majority of service-allocations stipulated in this document were incorporated in national Tables of Frequency Allocations and Utilisations which is with-in the responsibility of the appropriate national administration. The allocation might be primary, secondary, exclusive, and shared.
primary allocation:  is indicated by writing in capital letters (see example below)
secondary allocation: is indicated by small letters
exclusive or shared utilization: is within the responsibility of administrations 
However, military usage, in bands where there is civil usage, will be in accordance with the ITU Radio Regulations. In NATO countries military utilizations will be in accordance with the NATO Joint Civil/Military Frequency Agreement (NJFA).

  Frequency range
 
      415... 495   kHz
      505...526,5  kHz
     1606,5...1625 kHz
     1635...1800   kHz
     2045...2160   kHz
     2170...2173,5 kHz
     2190,5...2194 kHz
     2625...2650   kHz
     4000...4438   kHz
     6200...6525   kHz
     8100...8815   kHz
    12230...13200  kHz
    16360...17410  kHz
    18780...18900  kHz
    19680...19800  kHz
    22000...22855  kHz
    25070...25210  kHz
    26100...26175  kHz

See also

Radio station
Radiocommunication service

References 

Mobile services ITU
Maritime communication